David Stein may refer to:

 David Stein (art forger) (1935–1999)
 David Stein (radio host), American radio host of The David Stein Show since 2006
 David Stein, American CIA analyst who in 1998 solved the first three parts of the Kryptos sculpture
 David Stein, aka David Cole (journalist), Holocaust denier who changed his name